Insoo Kim Berg (25 July 1934 – 10 January 2007) was a Korean-born American psychotherapist who was a pioneer of solution focused brief therapy.

Biography
Berg was born and raised in Seoul, Korea. She was a pharmacy major at Ewha Womans University in Seoul. In 1957, she travelled to the United States after her marriage to Charles Berg. She  began her studies at University of Wisconsin-Milwaukee in 1960, earning undergraduate and graduate degrees in social work. She subsequently began her social work practice in Milwaukee. Berg and her first husband, Charles, divorced in 1972. They have a daughter, Sarah K. Berg.

Berg completed post-graduate studies at the Family Institute of Chicago, the Menninger Foundation in Kansas, and the Mental Research Institute (MRI) in Palo Alto, California. At the MRI she also met her future husband, Steve de Shazer. She and Steve married in June 1977.

Berg died on January 10, 2007, in Milwaukee, at the age of 72.

Solution-focused heritage

Solution-Focused Brief Therapy 
In 1978, Berg and de Shazer co-founded the Brief Family Therapy Center (BFTC) in Milwaukee. Berg was the executive director and a clinician at the BFTC. Berg and de Shazer are recognized as the primary developers of solution-focused brief therapy, which emerged from research they conducted at the BFTC in the 1980s, building upon studies conducted at the Mental Research Institute.

Berg led training workshops on solution-focused therapy in countries around the world, including Japan, South Korea, Denmark, Sweden, Norway, Russia, Israel, Australia, Singapore, United Kingdom, France, Switzerland and Germany. She authored a number of books on solution-focused approaches to therapy. Her books include Interviewing for Solutions (with Peter De Jong), Brief Coaching for Lasting Solutions, Family Based Services:A Solution Based Approach, Children's Solution Work (with Therese Steiner), Working with the Problem Drinker (with Scott D. Miller), Tales of Solution (with Yvonne Dolan), Building Solutions in Child Protective Services (with Susan Kelly), Solutions Step by Step:A Substance Abuse Treatment Manual (with Norman H. Ruess), and Brief Coaching for Lasting Solutions (with Peter Szabo).

Solution-Focused Applied Psychology (SoFAP) 
Alongside the popular development of the practical application of solution-focused therapy, its theoretic foundation has been the topic of research in an academic context. The academic discipline of Solution-Focused Applied Psychology (SoFAP)  uses the methodology offered by design science to investigate the epistemology that underlies the application of the solution-focused approach. In  intuitive form, this approach was originally recognized in the practice of Dr. Milton H. Erickson and subsequently concretized by Berg and de Shazer, particularly in the latter's book Patterns of Brief Family Therapy: An Ecosystemic Approach.

Works 
 Berg, Insoo Kim, and Scott Miller. Working with the Problem Drinker: A Solution-focused Approach. New York: Norton, 1992. 
 Berg, Insoo Kim, Family-based Services: A Solution-focused Approach. New York: Norton, 1994. 
 Berg, Insoo Kim & Susan Kelly. Building Solutions in Child Protective Services. New York: Norton, 2000. 
 Berg, Insoo Kim & Yvonne M. Dolan. Tales of Solutions: A Collection of Hope-inspiring Stories. New York: Norton, 2001. 
 Berg, Insoo Kim & Peter Szabó. Brief Coaching for Lasting Solutions. 2005. 
 De Jong, Peter & Insoo Kim Berg. Interviewing for Solutions(4th ed.) Pacific Grove, Calif.: Brooks/Cole, 2012.

See also
Solution-focused brief therapy

References

External links
 Solution-Focused Brief Therapy Association (SFBTA)
 The Mental Research Institute (MRI)
 Social Construction Therapies Network

1934 births
2007 deaths
Ewha Womans University alumni
University of Wisconsin–Milwaukee alumni
Family therapists
People from Seoul
American psychotherapists